Statistics of the Primera División de México for the 1953–54 season.

Overview

Toluca was promoted to Primera División.

The season was contested by 12 teams, and Marte won the championship.

Atlas was relegated to Segunda División.

Teams

League standings

Results

References
Mexico - List of final tables (RSSSF)

1953-54
Mex
1953–54 in Mexican football